WCMM (102.5 FM, "The Moose") is a radio station broadcasting a country music format. Licensed to Gulliver, Michigan, it first began broadcasting under the WAPJ call sign.

References
Michiguide.com - WCMM History

External links

CMM
Radio stations established in 1988